The Netherlands Football League Championship 1912–1913 was contested by eighteen teams participating in two divisions. The national champion would be determined by a play-off featuring the winners of the eastern and western football division of the Netherlands. Sparta Rotterdam won this year's championship by beating Vitesse Arnhem 2-1 and 2–1.

New entrant
Eerste Klasse East:
HVV Tubantia

Divisions

Eerste Klasse East

Eerste Klasse West

Championship play-off

Sparta Rotterdam won the championship.

References
RSSSF Netherlands Football League Championships 1898-1954
RSSSF Eerste Klasse Oost
RSSSF Eerste Klasse West

Netherlands Football League Championship seasons
1912–13 in Dutch football
Netherlands